Duneh (also Romanized as Dūneh and Downah) is a village in Chah Salem Rural District, in the Central District of Omidiyeh County, Khuzestan Province, Iran. At the 2006 census, its population was 559, in 106 families.

References 

Populated places in Omidiyeh County